Adoretus sinicus or the Chinese rose beetle is a scarab beetle, and a member of the genus Adoretus, subgenus Adoretus.

Food

In Oʻahu it feeds on the indigenous ʻakiohala (Hibiscus furcellatus) and  maʻo hau hele (Hibiscus brackenridgei).

References

Rutelinae
Beetles described in 1855